Shichahai Subdistrict is a subdistrict on the northern portion of Xicheng District, Beijing, China. As of 2020, its total population was 75,447.

The subdistrict was named after Shichahai, a collection of three lakes within the subdistrict.

History

Administrative Division 
By 2021, there are a total of 22 communities within the subdistrict:

Landmarks 

 Shichahai
 Beihai Park
 Former Residence of Soong Ching-ling
 Prince Gong's Mansion
 Guo Moruo Residence
 Huode Zhenjun Temple
 Church of the Saviour

External links 
 Official website (Archived)

References 

Xicheng District
Subdistricts of Beijing